A Single Girl is a 1995 French drama film directed by Benoît Jacquot. It follows a day in the life of a young Parisian woman named Valérie (Virginie Ledoyen) who begins a new job at a four-star hotel the same day she reveals to her boyfriend (Benoît Magimel) that she is pregnant. The 90-minute film is shot in real time, with a very mobile camera style, recalling the French New Wave.

This was the breakthrough role for the 19-year-old Ledoyen (who later became known in the United States for the 2000 film The Beach), and earned her a César Award nomination.

Cast

Production
The film contains a non-simulated sex scene performed by Catherine Guittoneau and Hervé Gamelin. Virginie Ledoyen, who in the scene enters the room where the two are, said that director Benoît Jacquot had not warned her what was behind the door (she knew she was going to find a couple making love, but she did not think they would do it for real).

References

External links
 
 

1995 films
1995 drama films
1990s French-language films
1990s pregnancy films
Films directed by Benoît Jacquot
Films set in hotels
Films set in Paris
Films shot in Paris
French drama films
French pregnancy films
1990s French films